Steinrode is a former municipality in the district of Eichsfeld in Thuringia, Germany. Since 1 December 2011, it is part of the municipality Sonnenstein, of which it is an Ortschaft. The Ortschaft Steinrode consists of the villages Werningerode and Epschenrode.

References

Former municipalities in Thuringia
Sonnenstein, Thuringia